Tankyrase, also known as tankyrase 1, is an enzyme that in humans is encoded by the TNKS gene. It inhibits the binding of TERF1 to telomeric DNA.
Tankyrase attracts substantial interest in cancer research through its interaction with AXIN1 and AXIN2, which are negative regulators of pro-oncogenic β-catenin signaling. Importantly, activity in the β-catenin destruction complex can be increased by tankyrase inhibitors and thus such inhibitors are a potential therapeutic option to reduce the growth of β-catenin-dependent cancers.

Description
Tankyrase-1 is a poly-ADP-ribosyltransferase involved in various processes such as Wnt signaling pathway, telomere length and vesicle trafficking. Acts as an activator of the Wnt signaling pathway by mediating poly-ADP-ribosylation (PARylation) of AXIN1 and AXIN2, 2 key components of the beta-catenin destruction complex: poly-ADP-ribosylated target proteins are recognized by RNF146, which mediates their ubiquitination and subsequent degradation. Also mediates PARsylation of BLZF1 and CASC3, followed by recruitment of RNF146 and subsequent ubiquitination. Mediates PARsylation of TERF1, thereby contributing to the regulation of telomere length. Involved in centrosome maturation during prometaphase by mediating PARsylation of HEPACAM2/MIKI. May also regulate vesicle trafficking and modulate the subcellular distribution of SLC2A4/GLUT4-vesicles. May be involved in spindle pole assembly through PARsylation of NUMA1. Stimulates 26S proteasome activity.

Protein interactions 
TNKS has been shown to interact with:

 FNBP1, 
 MCL1, 
 TERF1, and
 TNKS1BP1.

References

Further reading 

 
 
 
 
 
 
 
 
 
 
 
 
 
 
 
 
 

Telomere-related proteins
Aging-related enzymes